Coptotriche zimbabwiensis is a moth of the family Tischeriidae, found in the Bvumba Mountains of Zimbabwe.

References

Moths described in 2003
Tischeriidae
Endemic fauna of Zimbabwe
Moths of Africa